Ambarcık can refer to:

 Ambarcık, Aydın
 Ambarcık, Çavdır